Bobby Wishart (10 March 1933 – 3 December 2020) was a Scottish footballer, who played for Aberdeen, Dundee, Airdrie and Raith Rovers. Wishart won the Scottish league championship in 1955 with Aberdeen and 1962 with Dundee.

Wishart died on 3 December 2020, at the age of 87.

References

External links
Dundee FC profile

1933 births
2020 deaths
Footballers from Edinburgh
Scottish footballers
Scottish Football League players
Aberdeen F.C. players
Dundee F.C. players
Airdrieonians F.C. (1878) players
Raith Rovers F.C. players
Association football inside forwards
Scotland under-23 international footballers
Scottish Football League representative players